Diplocyclos palmatus is a vine in the family Cucurbitaceae. It is commonly known as native bryony or striped cucumber. In Marathi, it is called  due to its seed which resembles a lingam.

Distribution
The plant is a rich source of medicinal drugs with a consequent global anthropogenic distribution in rainforests and dry rainforests (Tropical and subtropical dry broadleaf forests) habitats. The vine grows in thickets, monsoon forests, lowland and upland disturbed areas, and mountain rain forest.

References

External links

Cucurbitoideae
Flora of Malesia
Flora of Papua New Guinea
Flora of New South Wales
Flora of the Northern Territory
Flora of Queensland
Flora of Western Australia
Flora of Western New Guinea
Vines